Graham Fink is  a Multimedia artist and one of the world's most awarded creatives.

He was recently Chief Creative Officer at the advertising agency Ogilvy & Mather in China. Before taking up that appointment in April 2011 he was  Executive Creative Director at M&C Saatchi in London. In 1995, he began directing television commercials and music videos  at the Paul Weiland film company. Previously, he was Deputy Creative Director at the Gold Greenlees Trott, and Group Head at Saatchi & Saatchi and WCRS. Before that he was an Art Director at CDP. To get this job he dressed up as an old man ( CDP didn't take on junior creatives ). His first job in advertising was as Art Director at Medcalf, Wrightson, Lovelock.  All five companies are or were London advertising agencies.

He became the youngest ever President of D&AD (Design and Art Directors Association) in 1996. He was subsequently voted into D&AD's 'Art Direction book' representing the top 28 Art Directors of all time.

He has won awards at Cannes, D&AD, One Show, BAFTA, Clio's, LIAA, BTAA, Campaign's UK Big Awards, Creative Circle, Mobius, Eurobest, EPICA, New York Festival, China 4A's, Longxi, SPIKES. In 2011 he won the UK Creative Circle President's Award. And in 2012 he won Ogilvy Asia's first ever Cannes Grand Prix.

His award-winning photography has been used in many advertising campaigns including PlayStation's 'Blood' and 'Mental Wealth' poster campaigns. 
He also directed a short film ( Z ) for the Millennium, commissioned by David Puttnam which was shortlisted at BAFTA.

In 2001 he created  thefinktank, a conceptual production company and theartschool (which was dubbed Britain's most radical art school). In 2005 he was awarded a  Honorary Doctorate at Bucks New University

In 2014 he had his first one-man exhibition at London's Riflemaker gallery called NOMADS. In 2015 he had his second exhibition in London entitled Drawing with my eyes. For this he drew directly onto a screen using only his eyes via a Tobii eye tracker and software he developed himself with Tobii.

References

External links
http://www.grahamfink.com
http://www.huffingtonpost.com/2015/03/24/graham-fink-eyes_n_6932762.html?1427226337
http://thecreatorsproject.vice.com/blog/graham-fink-is-drawing-with-his-eyes
http://www.thefinktank.com

http://www.mcsaatchi.com
https://web.archive.org/web/20081219163812/http://www.dandad.co.uk/
http://www.computerarts.co.uk/in_depth/interviews/m_and_c_saatchi

Living people
British advertising executives
Year of birth missing (living people)
Photographers from London